Marcum was a post office in Clay County, Kentucky from March 11, 1908 to June 1984.

It was named for postmaster Henry B. Marcum Jr, who originally established it just below and crosses from the mouth of Sugar Creek on the Red Bird River.

Cross-reference

Sources

 

Unincorporated communities in Clay County, Kentucky
Unincorporated communities in Kentucky